A gazelle is one of many antelope species in the genus Gazella .  This article also deals with the seven species included in two further genera, Eudorcas and Nanger, which were formerly considered subgenera of Gazella. A third former subgenus, Procapra, includes three living species of Asian gazelles.

Gazelles are known as swift animals. Gazelles are found mostly in the deserts, grasslands, and savannas of Africa; but they are also found in southwest and central Asia and the Indian subcontinent. They tend to live in herds, and eat fine, easily digestible plants and leaves.

The gazelle genera are Gazella, Eudorcas, and Nanger. The taxonomy of these genera is confused, and the classification of species and subspecies has been an unsettled issue. Currently, the genus Gazella is widely considered to contain about 10 species. One subspecies is extinct: the Queen of Sheba's gazelle. Most surviving gazelle species are considered threatened to varying degrees. Closely related to the true gazelles are the Tibetan goa and Mongolian gazelles (species of the genus Procapra), the blackbuck of Asia, and the African springbok.

One widely familiar gazelle is the African species Thomson's gazelle (Eudorcas thomsonii), sometimes referred to as a "tommie". The males have long, often curved, horns. Like many other prey species, tommies exhibit a distinctive behaviour of stotting (running and jumping high before fleeing) when they are threatened by predators, such as cheetahs, lions, African wild dogs, crocodiles, hyenas, and leopards.

Etymology and their name

To Europe it first came to Old Spanish and Old French, and then around 1600 the word entered the English language. The Arab people traditionally hunted the gazelle. Later appreciated for its grace, however, it became a symbol most commonly associated in Arabic literature with human female beauty. In many countries in Northwestern Sub-Saharan Africa, the gazelle is commonly referred to as "dangelo", meaning "swift deer".

Symbolism or totemism in African families
The gazelle, like the antelope to which it is related, is the totem of many African families.  Some examples include the Joof family of the Senegambia region, the Bagananoa of Botswana in Southern Africa (said to be descended from the BaHurutshe), and the Eraraka (or Erarak) clan of Uganda. As is common in many African societies, it is forbidden for the Joof or Eraraka to kill or touch the family totem.

Poetry 

One of the traditional themes of Arabic love poetry involves comparing the gazelle with the beloved, and linguists theorize ghazal, the word for love poetry in Arabic, is related to the word for gazelle. It is related that the Caliph Abd al-Malik (646–705) freed a gazelle that he had captured because of her resemblance to his beloved:

The theme is found in the ancient Hebrew Song of Songs. (8:14)

Species

The gazelles are divided into three genera and numerous species.

Prehistoric extinctions
Fossils of genus Gazella are found in Pliocene and Pleistocene deposits of Eurasia and Africa. The tiny Gazella borbonica is one of the earliest European gazelles, characterized by its small size and short legs. Gazelles disappeared from Europe at the start of the Ice Age, but they survived in Africa and Middle East.

 Genus Gazella
 Gazella borbonica - Pleistocene Europe
 Gazella capricornis - Miocene Asia
 Gazella harmonae - Pliocene of Ethiopia, unusual spiral horns
 Gazella praethomsoni - Pliocene Africa 
 Gazella negevensis - Early Miocene Asia
 Gazella thomasi - Thomas's gazelle

 Gazella vanhoepeni - Pliocene Africa 
 Subgenus Vetagazella
 Gazella altidens 
 Gazella blacki - Pliocene Asia
 Gazella deperdita - Late Miocene Europe
 Gazella dorcadoides - Middle Miocene Asia
 Gazella pilgrimi - Late Miocene Europe
 Gazella gaudryi - Middle Miocene Eurasia
 Gazella kueitensis - Pliocene Asia
 Gazella lydekkeri - Mid to Late Miocene Asia
 Gazella paotehensis - Middle Miocene Asia
 Gazella paragutturosa - Pleistocene Asia
 Gazella parasinensis - Pliocene Asia
 Gazella praegaudryi - Pleistocene Africa
 Gazella sinensis - Pliocene Asia
 Gazella brianus - Pliocene Asia
 Subgenus Gazella
 Gazella janenschi - Pliocene Africa
 Subgenus Trachelocele
 Gazella atlantica - Pleistocene Africa
 Gazella tingitana - Pleistocene Africa
 Subgenus Deprezia
 Gazella psolea - Pliocene Africa

Gallery

References

External links

 
Mammals of Africa
True antelopes
Extant Pliocene first appearances
Taxa named by Henri Marie Ducrotay de Blainville